Timothy C. Mitchell (born 5 April 1963) is a Grammy winning music record producer, songwriter, and guitarist from Detroit, Michigan.

Early life
Mitchell was born on April 5, 1963 to Dr. David Mitchell and Edith Mitchell (née Clements) at Henry Ford Hospital in Detroit, Michigan where his father was an orthopedic surgeon.  He was the youngest of three children, following sister Peyton and brother David. He grew up in Grosse Pointe Farms, Michigan and attended Interlochen Arts Academy, an independent high school dedicated to the arts in Interlochen, Michigan. He then went on to graduate from the School of Music at the University of Miami.

Career

Bob Seger
In 1996, he played and toured in Bob Seger's band and co-wrote three songs with Seger, for his It's a Mystery album: "Lock and Load," "Hands in the Air," and "Revisionism Street."

Shakira
Mitchell produced Shakira's MTV Unplugged Album in 1999 that went on to win the Grammy Award for Best Latin Pop Album at the 43rd Grammy Awards. He co-wrote and co-produced the song Whenever, Wherever for Shakira's Laundry Service album and produced her concert DVD from the Oral Fixation Tour.

References

External links
 

Grammy Award winners
Living people
1963 births